Asociația Fotbal Club Voința Lupac, also known as  Voința Lupac, is a Romanian football club based in Lupac, Caraș-Severin County, currently playing in Liga III, the third tier of the Romanian football league system, following their promotion from the Liga IV – Caraș-Severin County in the 2020–21 season. The players are nicknamed the Croats, because Lupac commune was mostly made up of Krashovani Croats.

History 
The croats won the Caraș-Severin County Championship for the first time in the 2014–15 season, but lost the promotion play-off in Liga III with ASU Politehnica Timișoara, the winner of Liga IV – Timiș County after 1–5 at Timișoara and 2–1 at Lupac.

Voința managed to win again the Liga IV – Caraș-Severin County in the 2017–18 season and faced in the promotion play-off, the winner of Liga IV – Hunedoara County, CS Hunedoara, but despite a 1–0 away win in the first leg, Voința lost the promotion after an 1–2 defeat in the second leg in front of their own supporters.

At the end of 2018–19 season, Voința Lupac, led by Boșco Vișatovici, crowned as county champion of Liga IV – Caraș-Severin County and qualified for the promotion play-off in Liga III, but lost (0–2 at home and 1–6 away) in front of Fortuna Becicherecu Mic, the winner of Liga IV – Timiș County. 

Voința promoted for the first time in its history to Liga III at the end of the 2020–21 season. Coached by Boșco Vișatovici, the croats won the Liga IV – Caraș-Severin County and the promotion play-off against Universitatea Craiova II (0–1 at Craiova and 3–0 at Lupac).

As newly promoted in the 2021–22 Liga III, Voința Lupac reached the play-off in the seventh series and finished in 3rd place, ahead of Pandurii Târgu Jiu and behind CSM Reșita and CSM Deva who finished in the first two places. The squad of the first season in the third league included players like: Cătălin Căpățână, Dragoș Trașcă, Daniel Petruț, Dragoș Circa, Cristian Danci, Milorad Banac, Daniel Vădrariu, Andrei Vaștag, Alexandru Avramovici, Alexandru Giurică, Flavius Lucica, Bogdan Bărbulescu, Robert Dalea, Takenori Kawagoe, Andrea Săndescu, Denis Jivan, Denis Arjocan, Flavius Cega, Vichente Marcu, Emanuel Jinga, Cristian Popa, Demetris Cristodulo among others.

Lucian Dobre was appointed as the new head coach for 2022–23 season.

Honours 
Liga IV – Caraș-Severin County
Winners (4): 2014–15, 2017–18, 2018–19, 2020–21
Runners-up (5): 2009–10, 2011–12, 2012–13, 2015–16, 2016–17

Players

First team squad

Out on loan

Club officials

Board of directors

Current technical staff

League history

References

External links
 
  FRF-AJF Profile

Football clubs in Romania
Football clubs in Caraș-Severin County
Association football clubs established in 1982
Liga III clubs
Liga IV clubs
1982 establishments in Romania